Bang Khae Nuea (lit: "north Bang Khae") is a khwaeng (sub-district) of Bang Khae District, Bangkok.

Geography
Bang Khae Nuea is a central area of Bang Khae, with a total area of 12.060 km2 (4.656 mi2). It is bounded by other sub-districts (from the north clockwise): Bang Phai in its district, Khlong Khwang in Phasi Charoen District (Khlong Bang Waek is a borderline), Khlong Khwang in Phasi Charoen District (Khlong Phraya Ratchamontri is a borderline), Bang Khae and Lak Song in its district (Phet Kasem Road (Highway 4) is a borderline), Nong Khang Phlu in Nong Khaem District (Khlong Thawi Watthana is a borderline).

Population
In 2019, it had a total population of 60,111 people.

Places
The Mall Bangkhae
Bang Khae MRT Station (shared with Bang Khae)
Lak Song MRT Station (shared with Bang Khae)
Bangkhae Condotown
Lak Song Police Station
Phasi Charoen Post Office
Kasemrad BK Hospital
Rajavinit Bangkae Pankhum School
Muban Setthakit

References

Subdistricts of Bangkok
Bang Khae district